Gianni Govoni (born 6 April 1967) is an Italian former equestrian. He competed at the 1992 Summer Olympics and the 2000 Summer Olympics.

References

External links
 

1967 births
Living people
Italian male equestrians
Olympic equestrians of Italy
Equestrians at the 1992 Summer Olympics
Equestrians at the 2000 Summer Olympics
Sportspeople from the Province of Modena
People from Finale Emilia